Thomas Rhys Bevan (born 9 September 1999) is a Welsh cricketer who plays for Glamorgan. Born in Cardiff, he is a right-handed batter and bowls part-time right arm off spin. 

Bevan was educated at Millfield School. After regular appearances for Glamorgan's 2nd XI and the Wales National County, he made his debut for the Glamorgan 1st XI in a T20 Blast game away to Essex on 2 July 2022; opening the batting with Sam Northeast, he made just 4 runs before he was caught out. He played again the next day in an away match against Kent, making 21 runs before he was trapped lbw. He made his List A debut in the Royal London One-Day Cup on 14 August 2022, again away to Essex at Chelmsford; batting at number 5, he made 14 runs.

In October 2022, Bevan received the John Derrick award for the best young cricketer at Glamorgan Cricket Club.

References

External links
Profile at ESPNcricinfo

1999 births
Living people
Cricketers from Cardiff
Welsh cricketers
Glamorgan cricketers
Wales National County cricketers
People educated at Millfield